Glider Rider is an isometric action-adventure game published by Quicksilva in 1986 for the ZX Spectrum, Commodore 64, and Amstrad CPC. The music was composed by David Whittaker.

Plot 
The criminal Abraxas Corporation must be destroyed. An agent has been sent to their artificial island to bomb the ten reactors that power their base. To complete the mission he has been given a supply of grenades and a motorcycle capable of transformation into a hang glider.

Gameplay 
The player must destroy the reactors on the island by dropping grenades on them. The reactors are defended by laser gun towers which can be temporarily disabled by disrupting their control towers.

The player's character rides a machine which is a combination motorcycle and hang glider. By driving down a mountainside and suddenly reversing direction, the player can take to the air. He can fly in any direction, or lose height, but cannot climb higher. There are many mountains on the island to help him achieve flight. To destroy a reactor he must fly over it dropping grenades.

On touching ground the motorcycle is restored. If the player falls in the sea he will be eaten by sharks.

Reviews 
Sinclair User:"... it has the best sound ever heard on a Spectrum. Let's be honest, whilst Spectrum games are often the most original and inventive, sometimes most of us envy just a little the three-channel funk music possible on the Commodore. Envy no more, the continuous soundtrack on Glider Rider is as funky and exciting as anything you've heard - hardened Sinclair users in the office rose as one from their seats to stare at the TV - surely it couldn't be! Not only a get-on-down soundtrack but digitised effects as well, including a remarkable ring-modulated bell sound at the end of the game.".
In a 1986 review, Your Sinclair said that "Glider Rider is a bit like the island it's set on. Looks good from a distance, lacks real depth."

References

External links 

1986 video games
Action-adventure games
Amstrad CPC games
Commodore 64 games
Quicksilva games
Single-player video games
Video games developed in the United Kingdom
Video games scored by David Whittaker
Video games with isometric graphics
ZX Spectrum games
Binary Design games